Marshall White (born April 30, 1982) is an American professional strongman athlete.

Personal life 
Born in Houston, Texas, White lived for a time in Port Angeles, Washington, and in Pagosa Springs, Colorado with his then-wife Rachel, whom he married in 2005 and divorced in 2013. He was a mortician who owned his own funeral home in Colorado, in addition to being an active professional athlete and father. He now resides in the Houston Metro area.

Strength sports 
White played football for his junior high and high school in Texas. After graduating, he joined "The Unit", a Strongman group in Cypress, Texas headed by longtime friend and Strongman Travis Ortmayer. After training with "The Unit" for a year, White applied for a job which would place him in Port Angeles, Washington.

White initially trained at "Marunde Muscle" with World's Strongest Man competitor, the late Jesse Marunde. He earned his pro card in 2006, and competed in the 2006 ASC Nationals, finishing in 7th place overall.

White was training with Jacob Miskimens in their own shared facility in Washington when he purchased a funeral home in Pagosa Springs, Colorado.  He made the move to Colorado on March, 2009.

For 2008, White was invited to compete in the World's Strongest Man Super Series, which is a qualifying tour for the World's Strongest Man Competition. In January 2009, he competed in the Fit Expo in Pasadena, California, finishing in 4th place overall.

On July 4, 2009 White recorded his biggest win to date, a victory at the Strongman Super Series Bucharest contest, defeating Nick Best, Brian Shaw and Johannes Arsjo. This victory qualified him for the 2009 World's Strongest Man contest in Valletta, Malta. White competed in the qualifying heats but failed to qualify for the finals.

White recently competed in the 2011 World Log Lift Championships in Vilnius, Lithuania, finishing in 9th place with a lift of 170 kg.

Personal records

Strongman
Log Press:  170 kg {374 lb}

Olympic weightlifting
Snatch: 140 kg/308 lbs

Clean and Jerk: 160 kg/352 lbs 
Total: 300 kg/660 lbs

Powerlifting
Squat: 322 kg raw{715 lb}
Deadlift:  364 kg raw {800 lb}
Bench Press:  218 kg {480 lb}

Achievements
Professional Competitive Record - [1st (7),2nd (3),3rd (1) - Out of Total(21)]

Performance Metric - .891  [American - .862  International - .963]

Future Contests

Completed Contests

 America's Strongest Man(USA National Championship) - San Diego, California, USA - 5th place (6/21-22/2008)
 Strongman Bash for the Troops (USA National Qualifier) - Minneola, Florida, USA - 4th place (5/17/2008)
 Sequim Irrigation Festival Jesse Marunde Invitational - Sequim, Washington, USA - winner (5/3/2008)
 All American Challenge Fit Expo  (World's Strongest Man Super Series Qualifier) - Los Angeles, California, USA - 6th place (2/15-17/2008)
 Mohegan Sun Super Series (World's Strongest Man Qualifier) - Uncasville, Connecticut, USA - 8th place (1/19/2008)
 Utah's Strongest Man - Salt Lake City, Utah, USA - winner (8/18/2007)
 Big Tony's Strongman - New London, Wisconsin, USA - 3rd place (8/18/2007)
 Ladysmith Days Can-Am Strongman - Ladysmith, British Columbia, Canada - winner (8/04/2007)
 Saanich Sunfest Strongman - Saanich, British Columbia, Canada - winner (7/21/2007)
 Kamloops Strongman - Kamloops, British Columbia, Canada - winner (6/16/2007)
 Sequim Irrigation Festival - Sequim, Washington, USA - 2nd place (5/5/2007)
 Mohegan Sun Super Series (World's Strongest Man Qualifier) - Uncasville, Connecticut, USA - 7th place (4/22/2007)
 Fit Expo - Pasadena, California, USA - 9th place (2/16-18/2007)
 Oregon's Strongest Beaver - Portland, Oregon, USA - 2nd place (10/28/2006)
 World Strongman Cup - Vienna, Austria - 11th place (10/212006)
 America's Strongest Man(USA National Championship) - Columbia, South Carolina, USA - 7th place (7/21-22/2006)
 BCEAA Strongman - Victoria, British Columbia, Canada - winner (7/9/2006)
 Saanich Sunfest Strongman - Saanich, British Columbia, Canada - winner (7/81/2006)
 Utah's Strongest Man - Salt Lake City, Utah, USA - 5th place (6/10/2006)
 World Strongman Challenge - Tulsa, Oklahoma, USA - 8th place (5/19/2006)
 Sequim Irrigation Festival - Sequim, Washington, USA - 2nd place (5/6/2006)

Amateur Competitive Record - [1st (1), 2nd (1), 3rd (1) - Out of Total(6)]
Performance Metric - .883

 Hawaii's Strongest Man (NAS) (Amateur Platinum Plus Level Competition) - Hawaii, USA - winner (4/30/2006) earned ASC Professional Strongman Card
 Maxi-Flex Strongman Showdown - Clearwater, Florida, USA - 4th place (12/29/2005)
 Washington's Strongest Man - Clearwater, Florida, USA - 4th place (11/29/2005)
 Iron Bear Strongman - Port Townsend, Washington, USA - 3rd place (4/23/2005)
 Texas's Strongest Man - Texas, USA - 2nd place (5/29/2004)
 Texas's Strongest Man - Texas, USA - 8th place (5/29/2002)

External links
Official Marshall White web site

American strength athletes
1980 births
Living people
People from Port Angeles, Washington
Sportspeople from Houston
American powerlifters
American male weightlifters
People from Pagosa Springs, Colorado